The 1854 Iga–Ueno earthquake occurred on July 9, 1854, and struck the Kansai region of central Japan. According to the official confirmed report, 2,576 houses and buildings were damaged, with 995 human fatalities and 994 injures in the affected area.

Overview 

 Date : 
 Magnitude : 7.25 MK
 Richter scale : 7.4
 Epicenter : Iga, Mie Prefecture (then Iga Province)
 Death toll : 995 (official confirmed)

References 

1854 earthquakes
1854 in Japan
July 1854 events
Earthquakes of the Edo period
1854 disasters in Japan